Giles may refer to:

People 
 Giles (given name), male given name (Latin: Aegidius)
 Giles (surname), family name

 Saint Giles (650–710), 7th–8th-century Christian hermit saint
 Giles of Assisi, Aegidius of Assisi, 13th-century companion of St. Francis of Assisi
 Giles of Rome (1243–1316), 13th-century archbishop
 Carl Giles (1916–1995), British cartoonist for the Daily Express known simply as "Giles"
 Giles family, a fictional family featured in cartoons by Giles
 Herbert Giles (1845–1935), British diplomat and sinologist, co-author of the Wade–Giles Chinese transliteration system

Places 
United States
 Giles, Utah, a US ghost town
 Giles, West Virginia
 Giles County, Tennessee, US
 Giles County, Virginia, US
Australia
 Electoral district of Giles, a state electoral district in South Australia
 Giles Weather Station near the Western Australian - South Australian border
 Giles Land District, a land district (cadastral division) of Western Australia
Argentina
 San Andrés de Giles, a town in Buenos Aires Province
United Kingdom
 Chalfont St Giles, Buckinghamshire
 St Giles in the Wood, Devon

Other uses 
 "Giles", a solo electronica side-project of Tommy Giles Rogers, Jr. who is the frontman for the metal band Between the Buried and Me
 "Giles", a song by Unearth from III: In the Eyes of Fire
 Giles G-202, an aerobatic plane designed by Richard Giles
 Farmer Giles of Ham, a 1949 Medieval fable written by J. R. R. Tolkien
 Giles Goat-Boy, 1966 novel by John Barth, satire of American campus culture
 Giles (Buffy comic), story based on the Buffy the Vampire Slayer television series
 Giles (bacteriophage), a virus infecting the bacterial species Mycobacterium smegmatis

See also
 Gilles (disambiguation)